Uniformitarianism, also known as the Doctrine of Uniformity or the Uniformitarian Principle, is the assumption that the same natural laws and processes that operate in our present-day scientific observations have always operated in the universe in the past and apply everywhere in the universe. It refers to invariance in the metaphysical principles underpinning science, such as the constancy of cause and effect throughout space-time, but has also been used to describe spatiotemporal invariance of physical laws. Though an unprovable postulate that cannot be verified using the scientific method, some consider that uniformitarianism should be a required first principle in scientific research. Other scientists disagree and consider that nature is not absolutely uniform, even though it does exhibit certain regularities.

In geology, uniformitarianism has included the gradualistic concept that "the present is the key to the past" and that geological events occur at the same rate now as they have always done, though many modern geologists no longer hold to a strict gradualism. Coined by William Whewell, it was originally proposed in contrast to catastrophism by British naturalists in the late 18th century, starting with the work of the geologist James Hutton in his many books including Theory of the Earth. Hutton's work was later refined by scientist John Playfair and popularised by geologist Charles Lyell's Principles of Geology in 1830. Today, Earth's history is considered to have been a slow, gradual process, punctuated by occasional natural catastrophic events.

History

18th century

The earlier conceptions likely had little influence on 18th-century European geological explanations for the formation of Earth.  Abraham Gottlob Werner (1749–1817) proposed Neptunism, where strata represented deposits from shrinking seas precipitated onto primordial rocks such as granite. In 1785 James Hutton proposed an opposing, self-maintaining infinite cycle based on natural history and not on the Biblical account.

Hutton then sought evidence to support his idea that there must have been repeated cycles, each involving deposition on the seabed, uplift with tilting and erosion, and then moving undersea again for further layers to be deposited. At Glen Tilt in the Cairngorm mountains he found granite penetrating metamorphic schists, in a way which indicated to him that the presumed primordial rock had been molten after the strata had formed. He had read about angular unconformities as interpreted by Neptunists, and found an unconformity at Jedburgh where layers of greywacke in the lower layers of the cliff face have been tilted almost vertically before being eroded to form a level plane, under horizontal layers of Old Red Sandstone. In the spring of 1788 he took a boat trip along the Berwickshire coast with John Playfair and the geologist Sir James Hall, and found a dramatic unconformity showing the same sequence at Siccar Point. Playfair later recalled that "the mind seemed to grow giddy by looking so far into the abyss of time", and Hutton concluded a 1788 paper he presented at the Royal Society of Edinburgh, later rewritten as a book, with the phrase "we find no vestige of a beginning, no prospect of an end".

Both Playfair and Hall wrote their own books on the theory, and for decades robust debate continued between Hutton's supporters and the Neptunists. Georges Cuvier's paleontological work in the 1790s, which established the reality of extinction, explained this by local catastrophes, after which other fixed species repopulated the affected areas. In Britain, geologists adapted this idea into "diluvial theory" which proposed repeated worldwide annihilation and creation of new fixed species adapted to a changed environment, initially identifying the most recent catastrophe as the biblical flood.

19th century

From 1830 to 1833 Charles Lyell's multi-volume Principles of Geology was published. The work's subtitle was "An attempt to explain the former changes of the Earth's surface by reference to causes now in operation". He drew his explanations from field studies conducted directly before he went to work on the founding geology text, and developed Hutton's idea that the earth was shaped entirely by slow-moving forces still in operation today, acting over a very long period of time. The terms uniformitarianism for this idea, and catastrophism for the opposing viewpoint, was coined by William Whewell in a review of Lyell's book. Principles of Geology was the most influential geological work in the middle of the 19th century.

Systems of inorganic earth history

Geoscientists support diverse systems of Earth history, the nature of which rests on a certain mixture of views about the process, control, rate, and state which are preferred. Because geologists and geomorphologists tend to adopt opposite views over process, rate, and state in the inorganic world, there are eight different systems of beliefs in the development of the terrestrial sphere. All geoscientists stand by the principle of uniformity of law. Most, but not all, are directed by the principle of simplicity. All make definite assertions about the quality of rate and state in the inorganic realm.

Lyell
According to Reijer Hooykaas (1963), Lyell's uniformitarianism is a family of four related propositions, not a single idea:
 Uniformity of law – the laws of nature are constant across time and space.
 Uniformity of methodology – the appropriate hypotheses for explaining the geological past are those with analogy today.
 Uniformity of kind – past and present causes are all of the same kind, have the same energy, and produce the same effects.
 Uniformity of degree – geological circumstances have remained the same over time.

None of these connotations requires another, and they are not all equally inferred by uniformitarians.

Gould explained Lyell's propositions in Time's Arrow, Time's Cycle (1987), stating that Lyell conflated two different types of propositions: a pair of methodological assumptions with a pair of substantive hypotheses. The four together make up Lyell's uniformitarianism.

Methodological assumptions
The two methodological assumptions below are accepted to be true by the majority of scientists and geologists. Gould claims that these philosophical propositions must be assumed before you can proceed as a scientist doing science.  "You cannot go to a rocky outcrop and observe either the constancy of nature's laws or the working of unknown processes.  It works the other way around." You first assume these propositions and "then you go to the outcrop."

 Uniformity of law across time and space:  Natural laws are constant across space and time.
The axiom of uniformity of law <ref name=gould1987>, "Making inferences about the past is wrapped up in the difference between studying the observable and the unobservable. In the observable, erroneous beliefs can be proven wrong and be inductively corrected by other observations. This is Popper's principle of falsifiability. However, past processes are not observable by their very nature. Therefore, the invariance of nature's laws must be assumed to come to conclusions about the past."</ref> is necessary in order for scientists to extrapolate (by inductive inference) into the unobservable past.  The constancy of natural laws must be assumed in the study of the past; else we cannot meaningfully study it.

 Uniformity of process across time and space:  Natural processes are constant across time and space.

Though similar to uniformity of law, this second a priori assumption, shared by the vast majority of scientists, deals with geological causes, not physicochemical laws.  The past is to be explained by processes acting currently in time and space rather than inventing extra esoteric or unknown processes without good reason'',, "Strict uniformitarianism may often be a guarantee against pseudo-scientific phantasies and loose conjectures, but it makes one easily forget that the principle of uniformity is not a law, not a rule established after comparison of facts, but a methodological principle, preceding the observation of facts ... It is the logical principle of parsimony of causes and of the economy of scientific notions. By explaining past changes by analogy with present phenomena, a limit is set to conjecture, for there is only one way in which two things are equal, but there is an infinity of ways in which they could be supposed different." otherwise known as parsimony or Occam's razor.

Substantive hypotheses
The substantive hypotheses were controversial and, in some cases, accepted by few.  These hypotheses are judged true or false on empirical grounds through scientific observation and repeated experimental data. This is in contrast with the previous two philosophical assumptions that come before one can do science and so cannot be tested or falsified by science.

 Uniformity of rate across time and space:  Change is typically slow, steady, and gradual.

Uniformity of rate (or gradualism) is what most people (including geologists) think of when they hear the word "uniformitarianism," confusing this hypothesis with the entire definition.  As late as 1990, Lemon, in his textbook of stratigraphy, affirmed that "The uniformitarian view of earth history held that all geologic processes proceed continuously and at a very slow pace."

Gould explained Hutton's view of uniformity of rate; mountain ranges or grand canyons are built by the accumulation of nearly insensible changes added up through vast time.  Some major events such as floods, earthquakes, and eruptions, do occur.  But these catastrophes are strictly local.  They neither occurred in the past nor shall happen in the future, at any greater frequency or extent than they display at present. In particular, the whole earth is never convulsed at once.

 Uniformity of state across time and space''':  Change is evenly distributed throughout space and time.

The uniformity of state hypothesis implies that throughout the history of our earth there is no progress in any inexorable direction. The planet has almost always looked and behaved as it does now.  Change is continuous but leads nowhere. The earth is in balance: a dynamic steady state.

20th century
Stephen Jay Gould's first scientific paper, "Is uniformitarianism necessary?" (1965), reduced these four assumptions to two. He dismissed the first principle, which asserted spatial and temporal invariance of natural laws, as no longer an issue of debate. He rejected the third (uniformity of rate) as an unjustified limitation on scientific inquiry, as it constrains past geologic rates and conditions to those of the present. So, Lyell's uniformitarianism was deemed unnecessary.

Uniformitarianism was proposed in contrast to catastrophism, which states that the distant past "consisted of epochs of paroxysmal and catastrophic action interposed between periods of comparative tranquility" Especially in the late 19th and early 20th centuries, most geologists took this interpretation to mean that catastrophic events are not important in geologic time; one example of this is the debate of the formation of the Channeled Scablands due to the catastrophic Missoula glacial outburst floods. An important result of this debate and others was the re-clarification that, while the same principles operate in geologic time, catastrophic events that are infrequent on human time-scales can have important consequences in geologic history.
Derek Ager has noted that "geologists do not deny uniformitarianism in its true sense, that is to say, of interpreting the past by means of the processes that are seen going on at the present day, so long as we remember that the periodic catastrophe is one of those processes.  Those periodic catastrophes make more showing in the stratigraphical record than we have hitherto assumed."

Even Charles Lyell thought that ordinary geological processes would cause Niagara Falls to move upstream to Lake Erie within 10,000 years, leading to catastrophic flooding of a large part of North America.

Modern geologists do not apply uniformitarianism in the same way as Lyell. They question if rates of processes were uniform through time and only those values measured during the history of geology are to be accepted. The present may not be a long enough key to penetrating the deep lock of the past.  Geologic processes may have been active at different rates in the past that humans have not observed.  "By force of popularity, uniformity of rate has persisted to our present day.  For more than a century, Lyell's rhetoric conflating axiom with hypotheses has descended in unmodified form.  Many geologists have been stifled by the belief that proper methodology includes an a priori commitment to gradual change, and by a preference for explaining large-scale phenomena as the concatenation of innumerable tiny changes."

The current consensus is that Earth's history is a slow, gradual process punctuated by occasional natural catastrophic events that have affected Earth and its inhabitants. In practice it is reduced from Lyell's conflation, or blending, to simply the two philosophical assumptions. This is also known as the principle of geological actualism, which states that all past geological action was like all present geological action. The principle of actualism is the cornerstone of paleoecology.

Social sciences 
Uniformitarianism has also been applied in historical linguistics, where it is considered a foundational principle of the field. Linguist Donald Ringe gives the following definition:

See also
 Conservation law
 Noether's theorem
 Law of universal gravitation
 Astronomical spectroscopy
 Cosmological principle
 History of paleontology
 Paradigm shift
 Physical constant
 Physical cosmology
 Scientific consensus
 Time-variation of fundamental constants

Notes

References

Web

External links

 Uniformitarianism at Physical Geography
 
Have physical constants changed with time?

Metatheory of science
Evolution
Geological history of Earth
History of Earth science
Epistemology of science